is a volcanic group in Hokkaidō, Japan. Along with the Daisetsuzan Volcanic Group they make up the Ishikari Mountains in Daisetsuzan National Park. The group consists of andesite and dacite stratovolcanoes and lava domes.

List of volcanoes
The following table lists the mountains in the volcanic group.

References

Volcanism of Japan
Volcanoes of Hokkaido
Volcanic groups